Caulastrocecis interstratella is a moth of the family Gelechiidae. It is found in the southern part of European Russia (southern Ural, Lower Volga, Altai) and central Turkey.

References

Moths described in 1873
Caulastrocecis
Moths of Europe
Moths of Asia